Josiah Gumede may refer to:

 Josiah Tshangana Gumede, co-founder of African National Congress
 Josiah Zion Gumede, President of Zimbabwe Rhodesia